Sapkota is a crater on Mercury, located near the north pole.  It was named by the IAU in 2015, after Nepalese poet Mahananda Sapkota.

S band radar data from the Arecibo Observatory collected between 1999 and 2005 indicates a lack of a radar-bright area within the interior of Sapkota, despite the fact that the floor of the crater is in permanent shadow.  Many nearby craters do have radar-bright areas which likely indicate water ice deposits.

References

Impact craters on Mercury